Messengers 2: The Scarecrow is a 2009 American supernatural horror film, starring Norman Reedus, Claire Holt, and Erbi Ago. The film serves as a prequel to The Messengers. It was directed by Martin Barnewitz, and was released direct-to-video on DVD and Blu-ray on July 21, 2009.

Plot
The film opens with a woman (Miranda Weatherby) running through the corn fields from an unseen foe, who manages to kill her.

John Rollins (Norman Reedus), the head of the Rollins family, struggles to save his farm and hold his family together.  The corn fields are dying out because the irrigation system isn't working, and crows are eating the cobs out.  John is in debt to the bank.  His friend, a financial adviser, is trying to convince him to sell the land, but it is later revealed that it's for his own convenience. One day John discovers a secret door in his barn, where he finds a strange scarecrow.  After placing the mysterious scarecrow in the field, his luck changes, but this also activates a horrific curse that started it all.  While crops begin to grow, he begins to find dead birds in the field as well as a mysterious little girl who continues to appear out of nowhere. At the same time, his troubled marriage begins having more  complications.

Several people begin dying, including the financial adviser (after he makes a move to have John's farm repossessed) and a friend of John's who tries to hit on his wife, trying to convince her to leave John. At the same time, John encounters a new neighbor, Jude Weatherby (Richard Riehle), who seems to know more than he appears to about the events surrounding the scarecrow. John begins to believe that the scarecrow is the source of his issues and burns it, at the cost of missing his therapy session with his wife, damaging their relationship further. He goes to Jude for advice, instead seeing his wife, Miranda, who he had seen stripping before. Miranda gives him some tea, which she has laced with drugs. John falls and Miranda takes advantage of it and rapes him. John eventually realizes what Miranda did to him and feels guilty, made no better by his wife believing he's cheating on her.

John realizes his family has forsaken him for not living up to his promises, and then discovers that Jude and Miranda are the ghosts of the farm's former owners. They had evoked a voodoo curse to aid them, and they now tell John that to survive he must let the scarecrow kill his family. They reveal that the scarecrow does whatever is necessary to safeguard the land he oversees, and to ensure that his master's crops reach their full potential. It will destroy anyone who gets in the way of this, and seeing that John's family is a distraction to his farming, the scarecrow targets them next.

The sheriff is knocked unconscious, but Mary suspects that John assaulted him, and also killed the other two men. Believing John has gone mad, Mary attempts to get her children out. Her young son, Michael, who has been aware of the scarecrow all along, runs off to aid his father, where the rest see the scarecrow come to life and attack the family. The Scarecrow kills the sheriff and attacks the Rollins' teenage daughter, Lindsay. However, John manages to subdue the Scarecrow in a tussle and Michael runs it over with John's tractor. The family then destroys the scarecrow.

Cast

Production
Filming began April 2008 in Sofia, Bulgaria. Martin Barnewitz was attached to direct Messengers 2: The Scarecrow.

Reception
Like its predecessor, the film was panned by critics.  The reception ranges from 4.8 according to Internet Movie Database.  According to audiences the movie carries a 17% Rotten rating.

References

External links

2009 direct-to-video films
2009 horror films
Films shot in Bulgaria
Direct-to-video prequel films
Direct-to-video horror films
2009 films
Ghost House Pictures films
Sony Pictures direct-to-video films
Stage 6 Films films
Backwoods slasher films
2000s supernatural horror films
American supernatural horror films
Films set on farms
Films with screenplays by Todd Farmer
2000s English-language films
2000s American films
American prequel films